James Cribbs (born July 10, 1966) is a former American football defensive end. He played for the Detroit Lions in 1989.

References

1966 births
Living people
Players of American football from Memphis, Tennessee
American football defensive ends
Memphis Tigers football players
Detroit Lions players